This is a list of publishers dedicated either wholly or to a significant degree to publishing material written for, by, or about women. Many of them started during the "second wave" of feminism. The focus of this list is not on publishers which market to women, but on publishers who have a stated commitment to publishing feminist and other women's studies texts.

List of women's presses, with city, state or country location, and the year of their founding.

 13th Moon Press (2009–?)
Affinity Rainbow Publications
Arktoi Books (2006–present)
Artemis Press (2000–2012?)
Ash Tree Publishing (Woodstock, New York, 1985–present)
Aunt Lute Books (San Francisco, California, 1982–present)
Ayizi Yayınevi (İstanbul, Turkey, 2010-2019)
Bella Books (2001–present)
Belladonna* (2000–present)
Bedazzled Ink Publishing (2014–present)
 Black Woman Talk Collective (London, UK, 1983)
BLF Press (Bloomington, IN, 2014)  
Bold Strokes Books (2004–present)
Bold Story Press (Washington, DC, 2020–present)
Boston Women's Health Book Collective
Boudicca Press
 Bur Press (Lexington, Kentucky, 1942–1947)
Brain Mill Press (Green Bay, WI, USA, 2016–present) 
Bywater Books (2004–present)
Calisi Press
Calyx Press, Inc. (Corvallis, Oregon, 1976–present)
 Caitlin Press (Sunshine Coast, Canada 1977–present)
 Cleis Press (Berkeley, California, 1980–present)
 The Crossing Press (Berkeley, California, 1963–2002)
Desert Palm Press
 Éditions des Femmes (Paris, France, 1972–present)
 Editions iXe (Donnemarie-Dontilly, France, 2010–present) 
 :fr:Éditions du remue-ménage (Montreal, 1976–present)
 Eiderdown Books: books on female artists (UK, 2018–present) 
Elly Blue Publishing (Portland, Oregon, 2010–present)
Feminist Forum: Feminism in Japan and the World (Tokyo, Japan, 1979–1985)
 The Feminist Press (New York City, New York, 1970–present) 
 FEMRITE - Uganda Women Writers Association (Kampala, Uganda, 1995–present)
Flashpoint Publications (Ohio, USA, 2018–present)
Furore Verlag (Kassel, Germany 1986–present)
Gazing Grain Press
Green Dragon Press
Headmistress Press (2013–present)
Heartspark Press, (Olympia, Washington )
Héloïse Press, (Canterbury, UK, 2021-present)
 HerBooks Feminist Press (Santa Cruz, California, 1984–2002)
Herself Press
The HerStories Project
Honno (Aberystwyth, Wales, 1986–present)
Iowa City Women's Press (Iowa City, Iowa, 1973-1985)
Inanna Publications (Toronto, Ontario, Canada, 1972–present)
ISM Press
Jan-Carol Publishing
Josha Publishing (Haymarket, Virginia 2020-present)
 Kali for Women (India, 1984–2003) 
Kelsey St. Press
Kore Press
 Kitchen Table: Women of Color Press (New York City, New York, 1982–1989)
 KT press (London, England, 1998–present) Publisher of n.paradoxa: international feminist art journal and ebooks on women artists  
 Launch Point Press (Portland, Oregon, USA, 2014–present)
 Linen Press Books (Edinburgh, Scotland, 2007–present)
 Magnetewan Books (Vancouver, British Columbia, Canada, 2010–present)
 Midmarch Arts Press (New York, USA, 1975–2018) publishers of Women Arts News (1975-1998) and list of Women in the Arts books 
 Modjaji Books (Cape Town, South Africa, 2007–present)
Mother's Milk Books
New Victoria Publishers
 Onlywomen Press (London, UK, 1974–2010)
 Pandora Press (London, UK, 1990–1996)
 Paris Press (Ashfield, Massachusetts, 1995–present)
 Persephone Books (London, UK, 1999–present)
 Perugia Press (Northampton, Massachusetts, 1997–present)
 Press Gang Publishers (Vancouver, British Columbia, Canada, 1970–2002)
 Red Letter Press (Seattle, Washington, 1990–present)
 Second Story Press (Toronto, Ontario, Canada, 1988–present)
 Scarlet Press (London, UK, 1992–1999)
 Shameless Hussy Press (Berkeley, California, 1969–1989)
 Sheba Feminist Press (London, UK, 1980–1994)
 Silver Press (UK, 2017–present) 
 Sister Vision: Black Women & Women of Colour Press (Toronto, Ontario, Canada, 1985–present)
 Spinifex Press (Melbourne, Australia, 1991–present)
 Sumach Press (Toronto, Ontario, Canada, 2001–present?)
 Switchback Books (Denver, CO, 2006–present)
 Tender Buttons Press (New York City, 1989–present)
 Third Woman Press (San Antonio, USA, 1980–present)
 Verlag Krug & Schadenberg (Berlin, Germany, 1993–present)
 Virago Press (London, UK, 1973–present)
 With/out Pretend (Toronto, Ontario, Canada, 2015–present)
 Women Unlimited (New Delhi, India, 1985–present)
 The Women's Press (London, UK, 1978–2013)
 Women's Press (Toronto, Ontario, Canada, 1972–present)
 Zubaan (an imprint of Kali for Women; New Delhi, India, 1985–present)

See also
 List of English language book publishers
 List of English language literary presses
 List of English language small presses
 Women's writing in English

References

External links
 Women in Print Publisher List

Lists of book publishing companies
Feminist literature
History of literature
Small press publishing companies
Presses
Second-wave feminism